Filip Marjanović (born 10 February 1989) is a Serbian handball player. He plays for the Romanian club SCM Politehnica Timișoara and the Serbian national team.

He competed at the 2016 European Men's Handball Championship.

Individual awards
 Gala Premiilor Handbalului Românesc Liga Națională Left Wing of the Season: 2019

References

1989 births
Living people
Serbian male handball players
Handball players from Belgrade
Serbian expatriate sportspeople in Romania
Expatriate handball players